The Škoda Felicia is an automobile which was produced by AZNP from 1959 to 1964.

The Felicia was introduced in 1959 as a 2-door convertible, replacing the Škoda 450. Able to seat five persons, it was equipped with a folding hood and a plastic hardtop. Styling is similar to that of the contemporary Škoda Octavia. The Felicia was offered only with a 1089 cc (37 kW) four-cylinder engine however a Felicia Super model was introduced in 1961 powered by a larger 1221 cc (40 kW) four-cylinder. 

The cars were also imported to Western Europe or North America. A total of 14,863 Felicias were produced. The Felicia name was resurrected by Škoda in 1994 for a new model Škoda Felicia.

References

Cars introduced in 1959
Felicia (1959-1964)